

Dalhousie Mountain is a Canadian peak in the Cobequid Mountains and the highest elevation point in Pictou County, Nova Scotia.

Located north of Trunk 4 west of Salt Springs, the peak is accessible by vehicle using gated roads and is topped by wind turbines and a forest fire surveillance tower.

Wind farm
The Dalhousie Mountain Wind Farm was constructed in 2009 at a cost of $130 million and consists of 34 wind turbines with an installed capacity of 51 MW.  The turbines are clustered in the vicinity of Dalhousie Mountain as well as on the peak itself.  The wind farm is owned by RMSenergy Ltd and is operated as Dalhousie Mountain Wind Farm Operating Limited Partnership.

See also

 List of highest points of Canadian provinces and territories

External links
 Atlas of Canada - Facts about mountains

References

Wind farms in Nova Scotia
Mountains of Nova Scotia
Landforms of Pictou County